Mark Hollis is the only solo album by the former Talk Talk frontman Mark Hollis. It was released on Polydor Records on 26 January 1998, then reissued on Pond Life on 13 March 2000. In 2003, the album was released in LP format on Universal Records.

Its sound is noted for being extremely sparse and minimal; AllMusic called it "quite possibly the most quiet and intimate record ever made". Hollis found inspiration not in the popular music of the day, but rather in 20th-century classical music and jazz from the late fifties and sixties.

The album did not mark a return for Hollis to the music industry or live performance; he stated at the time of the album's release that "There won't be any gig, not even at home in the living room. This material isn't suited to play live."

Recording
The album was recorded as part of a two-album contract with Polydor, along with Talk Talk's 1991 Laughing Stock. At one point, the record was to be titled Mountains of the Moon and released under the Talk Talk name, but eventually it was decided it should be a self-titled solo project (early promotional CD-Rs and cassettes of the album contain the original details, with the CD-R retaining the attribution to Talk Talk). Recording and mixing the album was a slow and methodical process: the multitracks for each song were recorded on analog tape with a pair of Neumann M49 microphones, then digitally composited and overdubbed with a ProDigi X-850 tape recorder before being mixed back onto analog tape. Engineer Phill Brown, who also recorded Laughing Stock, stated that, compared to the final Talk Talk album, which he considered "one of [his] best projects" but "dark and claustrophobic", he found the solo release "the opposite…- open, restful and at times fantastically beautiful".

On 11 October 2011, Ba Da Bing Records released Mark Hollis on vinyl, marking the first time the album was issued on vinyl in the US. A reissue of the album was released on 18 October 2019 through UMC/Polydor.

Music 
"A Life (1895  1915)", which has been referred to as "the album's epic centrepiece" refers to Roland Leighton (1895–1915), a British soldier and poet who was the fiancé of Vera Brittain at the time of his death in World War I. Hollis has stated about the song, "That was someone born before the turn of the century…and dying within one year of the First World War at a young age. It was based on Vera Brittain's boyfriend. It's the expectation that must have been in existence at the turn of the century, the patriotism that must've existed at the start of the war and the disillusionment that must've come immediately afterwards. It's the very severe mood swings that fascinated me." The song correspondingly contains a variety of styles, tempi, and instrumentations.

Cover art 
The cover photo, taken by Stephen Lovell-Davis, is of southern Italy Easter bread designed to resemble the lamb of god. Lovell-Davis stated that Hollis selected the photo "much to the consternation of the record company."

Hollis stated about the image, "I like the way something appears to come out of his head; it makes me think of a fountain of ideas. Also the manner how the eyes are positioned fascinates me. When I saw the picture for the first time I had to laugh, but there's something very tragic about it at the same time."

Track listing

Personnel

Musicians 
 Mark Hollis – vocals, guitar
 Martin Ditcham – drums, percussion
 Chris Laurence – double bass
 Lawrence Pendrous – piano, harmonium
 Iain Dixon – clarinet
 Tim Holmes –  clarinet
 Mark Feltham – harmonica
 Henry Lowther – trumpet
 Andy Panayi – flute
 Melinda Maxwell – cor anglais
 Dominic Miller – guitar
 Robbie McIntosh – guitar
 Maggie Pollock – bassoon
 Julie Andrews – bassoon

Technical 
 Phill Brown – engineer
 Mark Hollis – producer
 Cally and Crane – design
 Stephen Lovell-Davis – photograph
 Keith Aspden – management

References

External links 
 
 Mark Hollis at www.snowinberlin.com an unofficial site with an extensive collection of Mark Hollis interviews.

Mark Hollis albums
1998 debut albums
Polydor Records albums